Zeeshan Pervez (Urdu: ذیشان پرویز) is a Pakistani Music Artist.

Zeeshan Parwez is a filmmaker / music producer based in Peshawar, Pakistan and he has been responsible for producing tracks for a couple of underground bands and some mainstream artists.

He is primarily involved with his band "Sajid and Zeeshan" and he has produced two full length albums titled “One Light Year At Snail Speed” and "The Harvest". He is also the founder of a post production / music studio, Zeepar Studios in Peshawar, established in 2004. Since then, he’s been busy making music videos, documentaries, movies for educational institutions and creating music. Zeeshan has been the video producer for Coke Studio Seasons 2,3 and 4 and Director for Ufone Uth Records. He has directed videos for many mainstream artists like Atif Aslam Ali Azmat and Mekaal Hasan Band. Zeeshan Parwez is also a session player and plays live keyboards and synths for Ali Azmat, Atif Aslam and many other artists.

Singles 
King Of Self
Freestyle Dive
My Happiness
Have To Let Go Sometimes
Start With A Scratch
Walk On Air
Sanity

Albums 
One Light Year At Snail Speed (August, 2006)
The Harvest (December 2011)

See also
Ali Azmat
Atish Raj
Nadeem F. Paracha
Fasi Zaka
Sajid Ghafoor
Jehangir Aziz Hayat

References

Year of birth missing (living people)
Living people
Pashtun people
Pakistani male singers
People from Peshawar
University of Peshawar alumni
Pakistani rock keyboardists